Walker is an unincorporated community in Corson County, South Dakota, United States. Although not tracked by the Census Bureau, Walker has been assigned the ZIP code of 57659.

The community was named for a local cattleman.

Notable person
 Former state legislator Ted Klaudt

References

Unincorporated communities in Corson County, South Dakota
Unincorporated communities in South Dakota